Daniel Gyasi (born 25 September 1994 in Kumasi) is a Ghanaian sprinter specialising in the 400 metres. He won relay medals at the 2014 African Championships and 2015 African Games.

His personal bests in the event are 46.45 seconds outdoors (Warri 2015) and 47.31 seconds indoors (Albuquerque 2015).

Competition record

References

1994 births
Living people
Sportspeople from Kumasi
Ghanaian male sprinters
Commonwealth Games competitors for Ghana
Athletes (track and field) at the 2014 Commonwealth Games
African Games bronze medalists for Ghana
African Games medalists in athletics (track and field)
Athletes (track and field) at the 2015 African Games
20th-century Ghanaian people
21st-century Ghanaian people